Traversia is a genus of New Zealand plants in the groundsel tribe within the daisy family.

Species

The only known species is Traversia baccharoides, found only in New Zealand.

References

Senecioneae
Monotypic Asteraceae genera
Endemic flora of New Zealand